Radnor station is a SEPTA Regional Rail station in Radnor, Pennsylvania. It is served by most Paoli/Thorndale Line trains.

The Radnor station was originally built in 1872, according to the Philadelphia Architects and Buildings project. It was a replacement for the former Morgan's Corner Station built by the Philadelphia and Columbia Railroad. The station was designed by Joseph M. Wilson and Frederick G. Thorn, both later of Wilson Brothers & Company, architects. Radnor's design was a brick variant of Wynnewood station, with a two-story agent's residence addition. A nearly identical version of Radnor Station was built by the Pennsylvania Railroad at Hawkins, just east of Pittsburgh.

After electrification, in 1917 a synchronous compensator for delivering reactive power was installed (see Amtrak's 25 Hz traction power system). This device was later removed.

Between 1999 and 2002, SEPTA restored and renovated the historic station building. The station building was restored, its historic eastbound shelter replaced with a modern structure, and new platforms, ramps, lighting, and signage were installed.

The ticket office at this station is open weekdays 5:55 a.m. to 1:25 p.m. excluding holidays. There are 220 parking spaces at the station. This station is 13.0 track miles (21 km) from Philadelphia's Suburban Station. In 2017, the average total weekday boardings at this station was 586, and the average total weekday alightings was 749.

Station layout
Radnor has two low-level side platforms with pathways connecting the platforms to the inner tracks.

References

External links
SEPTA - Radnor Station
Station from Google Maps Street View

SEPTA Regional Rail stations
Former Pennsylvania Railroad stations
Philadelphia to Harrisburg Main Line
Railway stations in the United States opened in 1872
Radnor Township, Delaware County, Pennsylvania
Railway stations in Delaware County, Pennsylvania